Qarahəsənli or Karagasanli or Karagasanly may refer to:
Qarahəsənli, Agstafa, Azerbaijan
Qarahəsənli, Nakhchivan, Azerbaijan